Central Albania is one of the three NUTS-2 Regions of Albania.

It consists of two counties: Tirana County and Elbasan County.

See also
Northern Albania (Ghegeria or Gegeria)
Southern Albania (Toskeria)

References

Subdivisions of Albania
NUTS 2 statistical regions of Albania